Robert Brown (9 October 1873 – 18 October 1918) was a British sports shooter. He competed in the team 300 metre free rifle event at the 1908 Summer Olympics.

References

1873 births
1918 deaths
British male sport shooters
Olympic shooters of Great Britain
Shooters at the 1908 Summer Olympics
Sportspeople from Birmingham, West Midlands